Ghiaurov Peak is a rocky 250 m peak in Delchev Ridge, Tangra Mountains on Livingston Island in the South Shetland Islands, Antarctica. The peak is named after the famous Bulgarian singer Nicolai Ghiaurov (1929–2004).

Location

Map
 L.L. Ivanov. Antarctica: Livingston Island and Greenwich, Robert, Snow and Smith Islands. Scale 1:120000 topographic map.  Troyan: Manfred Wörner Foundation, 2009.

References
 Ghiaurov Peak. SCAR Composite Antarctic Gazetteer
 Bulgarian Antarctic Gazetteer. Antarctic Place-names Commission. (details in Bulgarian, basic data in English)

External links
 Ghiaurov Peak. Copernix satellite image

Tangra Mountains